Li Wei (李纬 born Li Zhiyuan 李志远 1919 - 21 August 2005) was a Chinese actor.

Filmography
 1948 Spring in a Small Town 小城之春
1964 Two Stage Sisters 舞台姐妹
 1983 River Without Buoys 没有航标的河流
 1990 Ju Dou, Yang Jin-Shan as the elderly husband who buys a wife played by Gong Li

References

Chinese male film actors
1919 births
2005 deaths